AFGITMOLFM is a 2017 Philippine teen television film that aired on TV5' as part of its Wattpad Presents on July 8, 2017. It is based on the Pop Fiction book of the same name originally published year 2009 on CandyMag.com's Teen Talk section and it was popularized on Wattpad by Rayne Mariano (pen name: pilosopotasya). The television film is directed by Joel Ferrer, and it stars Myrtle Sarrosa, Richard Juan, and Kino Adrian Rementilla. It will be distributed by TV5 with the coordination of D5 Studios.

Cast
Myrtle Sarrosa as Janine Anne "Ianne" Santos

Ianne is a simple hopeless romantic student who can't take love seriously until she met the two guys who'll make her life a little bit exciting as she discovers the meaning of love for her.

Richard Juan as Art Felix "Emotionless Guy" Go

Art is the popular guy in school who is so emotionless, intelligent, and mysterious.

Kino Adrian Rementilla as Dan Nathaniel Moises "Nate" Manio

Nate is the boyfriend of Ianne, a boy-next-door type who is so charming as he swept everyone with his charming smile.

Plot
The story starts with Ianne and Nate's simple relationship as boyfriend-girlfriend. One day, Nate, out of nowhere, broke up with Ianne.

See also
List of programs broadcast by The 5 Network
List of Filipino films and TV series based on Wattpad stories

References

Philippine television films
TV5 (Philippine TV network) television specials
2017 television films
Romance television films